Ronnie Keith Harmon (born May 7, 1964) is an American former professional football player who was a running back in the National Football League (NFL). After a standout career at the University of Iowa in the Big Ten Conference, he played for 12 seasons (1986–1997) in the NFL. A 6 foot tall, 220-lb. running back, Harmon was selected by the Buffalo Bills in the 1st round (16th overall) of the 1986 NFL Draft.

Harmon was better known for his receiving rather than his rushing capabilities, a reputation he earned after committing four fumbles, all of which resulted in turnovers, in a 45-28 loss for Iowa against UCLA in the 1986 Rose Bowl Game. It was a disappointing end to an otherwise superb season for Harmon, who rushed for 1,111 yards, caught 49 passes for 597 yards, and scored 10 touchdowns.  Harmon finished his four seasons at Iowa with 4,028 yards from scrimmage, 126 receptions, 30 touchdowns, and 626 return yards on special teams.

Harmon played four seasons with the Buffalo Bills. In his final game with Buffalo, a 1989 AFC Divisional Playoff game at the Cleveland Browns, Harmon dropped a potential game-winning touchdown pass from Jim Kelly with :09 left in the fourth quarter.

Harmon also played in Super Bowl XXIX for the San Diego Chargers in their 49-26 loss against the 49ers, a game in which he led his team in receiving with 8 receptions for 68 yards. Ronnie's brothers Kevin and Derrick also played in the NFL.

Harmon is the only player in NFL history to average 4.5 yards per carry on 600 rushing attempts AND 10 yards per catch on 550 receptions.  He is also one of only five running backs to ever gain over 10,000 all-purpose yards and have less than 20 fumbles, the other four players being Charlie Garner, Brian Westbrook, Priest Holmes and DeAngelo Williams.

Harmon was a consensus all-city football player at Bayside High School in Bayside, Queens in New York City.

Ronnie's brother Kevin replaced him at running back after his graduation from Iowa.

References

1964 births
Living people
People from Bayside, Queens
People from Queens, New York
Sportspeople from Queens, New York
Players of American football from New York City
American football running backs
Iowa Hawkeyes football players
Buffalo Bills players
San Diego Chargers players
Houston Oilers players
Chicago Bears players
Tennessee Oilers players
American Conference Pro Bowl players
Bayside High School (Queens) alumni